ArcelorMittal Kryvyi Rih (former Kryvorizhstal is Ukraine's largest integrated steel company, founded in 1934 and located in Kryvyi Rih, in central Ukraine.

Bought in 2005 by Mittal Steel, the steel plant is one of the most important Ukrainian companies and a globally important steel producer. In Ukraine it is the largest steel manufacturer of both rebar and wire rod. ArcelorMittal Kryviy Rih also specializes in the manufacture of sections, angles, strips and billets. The plant produces over 6 MT of crude steel, 5 MT of rolled products and 5.5 MT of hot metal.

Production

Located entirely in Kryvyi Rih, this steel company was built as an integrated mining and steel plant, comprising:
 iron ore mine
 ore processing factories and two open pits
 coke-processing plant
 three sinter shops
 steel workshops of different types (two blast furnace shops, blooming facilities)
 three metal-rolling workshops.

Production volumes in 2021

 Ore mining: 24.5 million tons
 Concentrate: 11 million tons
 Hot metal: 5.3 million tons
 Steel: 4.9 million tons
 Rolled products: 4.6 million tons

Background

The presence of iron ore in the regions around Kryvyi Rih has been confirmed since at least 1781 and was rumored to have existed long before by generations of inhabitants. Throughout the 1800s, the region was surveyed for its mineral wealth. Iron ore of 70% iron content and manganese ores were located. In 1881, industrial extraction of iron ore began, alongside other developments such as the construction of the Kryvyi Rih railway. By 1884, over 100,000 tons of iron ore had been extracted, and the railway though Kryvyi Rih, 477 versts (505,6 km) long, from Yasynuvata station via Kryvyi Rih to Dolynska station, had been opened. Iron ore production expanded rapidly during the next few years. By 1896, 20 mines in the Kryvyi Rih Basin were producing over 1,000,000 tonnes of ore. Industrial expansion continued in the region up to 1917. Production dropped during the First World War.

Foundation and growth in Soviet Union

After the formation of the Soviet Union and expulsion of Austro-Hungarian forces and then anti-communist forces occupying the region under Anton Denikin, relative normalcy resumed. Planning of the plant began in 1929, with the intent to construct an integrated steel plant comprising iron ore and carbon mining to finished steel products. In 1931, the chairman of the Supreme Economic Council of the USSR, Grigori (Sergo) Ordzhonikidze, signed a decree ordering the construction of the facility; that same year, the foundation stone of the metallurgical plant was laid. In August 1934, the first metal was produced at Kryvorizhstal, later known as 'Kryvyi Rih Metallurgical Plant'.

Before the onset of the Second World War, the plant operated with three blast furnaces (of 3,160 m3) and two open hearth furnaces, along with a heat and power plant. In 1941, a blooming mill with a yearly capacity of 1.7 million tonnes, a fourth blast furnace and a third open hearth furnace came online, shortly before the Nazi occupation. Before German troops arrived, equipment and employees were evacuated to Nizhny Tagil, east of the Ural Mountains. During the German occupation from 14 August 1941 to 22 February 1944, what remained of the plant was left in ruins.

After recapturing of the area, the plant was rebuilt and continued its growth. Blast Furnace 7 was built in 1962, and Blast Furnace 8 was completed in 1970, making the plant the largest in Europe. In 1974, Blast Furnace 9 opened, the biggest in the world with a volume of 5,000 m3.

Ukrainian independence 

In 1996, restructuring took place, combining the mining and ore concentrating unit Novokrivorozhsky HZK (Новокриворізький ГЗК (НК ГЗК)) (NK-HZK) with the Kryvyi Rih State Mining and Metallurgical Combine (Kryvorizhstal) (Криворізького державного гірничо-металургійного комбінату "Криворіжсталь"). Kryvyi Rih coking plant (Криворізький коксохімічний завод (ККХЗ)) was included in the group in 1997, forming "Novokrivorozhsky mining and processing combine and Kryvyi Rih coking plant" (Новокриворізький гірничо-збагачувальний комбінат і Криворізький коксохімічний завод «Криворіжсталь»), or Kryvoriszhstal. This was all on paper, given that the three units had been always been designed to work jointly, and that the facilities were on the same site.

First privatization, 2004

Kryvorizhstal became internationally known when it was privatized in June 2004 for a sum of US$800 million, (₴4.26 billion.) against a government-set reserve price of $714 million, to a consortium called Investment-Metallurgical Union. This consortium included Rinat Akhmetov's SCM and Interpipe Group, controlled by then-President Kuchma's son-in-law Viktor Pinchuk. Higher offers from foreign investors, including a joint bid from Severstal/Arcelor, and a bid from Tata Steel, were rejected on bidding technicalities. The deal was widely criticized by the opposition and from abroad as an example of corruption and state property mismanagement.

On the initiative of newly elected President Viktor Yushchenko, the privatization deal was dismissed by a court in June 2005, and the company sold again in a fair auction.

2005, Second privatisation and ArcelorMittal company

At the time of the second privatisation, the company had annual sales of $1897 million with a net profit of $378 million, and cash reserves of $413 million. The plant had a production capacity of ~10 million tonnes of raw steel, and a rolling capacity of under 7 million tonnes, and was able to source most of its requirements for iron ore and coke locally. The bidding process was broadcast live on Ukrainian television, with Arcelor, Mittal Steel and Vadim Novinsky's Smart Holdings bidding - Mittal Steel was the highest bidder and acquired a 93.02 percent stake in Kryvorizhstal on 24 October 2005, for ₴ 24.2 billion, or US$4.81 billion. Mittal Steel was expected to finance the acquisition from its own cash reserves and from a $3 billion loan arranged with UK based Citigroup. The price exceeded analyst predictions of $3 billion, making it the largest privatization deal in the former Soviet Union.

In 2006, the company was renamed Mittal Steel Kryvyi Rih (Ukrainian : ВАТ «Міттал Стіл Кривий Ріг»), and later in 2007, after the takeover of Arcelor by Mittal steel to form ArcelorMittal, the company was renamed ArcelorMittal Kryvyi Rih.

During the late-2000s financial crisis, steel production dropped from 8.1 million tonnes in 2007 to 6.2 million in 2008 and 5 million in 2009, with decreases in other production metrics and revenues, with the company registering a net loss of 120 million UAH in 2009 (down from a profit of 4.7 billion UAH the year before). Production levels recovered to 2008 values in 2010.

Investments

Between 2006 and 2022 in Ukraine, the company's total investments amounted to $10 billion (including $ 4.8 billion – take over amount during the privatization + $ 5.2 billion - investment in production development).

Major investment projects from 2006 to 2022 include:
 Reconstruction of Coke Oven Batteries 3 and 4 ($199 million);
 Category 1 reconstruction of Blast Furnace No. 8 ($127 million);
 Reconstruction of Oxygen Block 2 ($45 million);
 Construction of ladle furnace and Continuous Caster Machine 1 ($112 million);
 Construction of the new packing line at Light Section Mill 2 ($16 million);
 Category 1 reconstruction of Blast Furnace 6 ($117 million);
 Pulverized coal injection built at Blast Furnace 9 ($60 million);
 Reconstruction of Coke Oven Batteries 5 and 6, along with the implementation of environmental measures and an automated environmental monitoring system ($157 million);
 Modernization of Sinter Shop 2 (over $180 million);
 Construction of two new continuous Casting Machines 2 and 3 (over $160 million);
 Reconstruction of Light Section Mill 250-4 (over $60 million);
 Construction of new gas cleaning plants for Basic Oxygen Furnaces 4, 5, and 6 with СО combustion and implementation of automated environmental monitoring system ($65 million);
 From 2008 to 2015, approximately $500 million were invested to replenish old crushers, build new sections at the beneficiation plants (total of three sections), purchase new ball mills, modernize the haulage fleet and in-pit equipment, open a new horizon at the Artem underground mine (1 135 m), and reconstruct the tailing ponds.
 In February 2022 the Russian large-scale invasion of Ukraine caused ArcelorMittal Kryvyi Rih to put it temporarily on hold several major investment projects, including a pellet plant construction initially slated to open in 2023. The company makes an exception only for those projects without which the production might stop completely. Such an example is the construction of a new tailing dump Tretya Karta, which is vital for the continuation of ore mining and safe storage of production waste. The commissioning of the new tailing dump will make it possible to abandon two old similar facilities and reduce the anthropogenic load on the nearby territories. ArcelorMittal company is investing over $150 million in this project.

Mauro Longobardo was appointed Chief Executive Officer of ArcelorMittal Kryvyi Rih, effective 18 February 2020.

See also
 List of steel producers

References

Sources

 Reuters - Major Ukraine steel plant ramps back up - but Russian troops are close Archived 18 May 2022 at the Wayback Machine.] (April 27, 2022);
 The CEO of ArcelorMittal Kryvyi Rih spoke about the Company's operation under quarantine Archived 23 January 2022 at the Wayback Machine.] (31 March 2020);
 WPROST - Gigantyczna fabryka wznowi produkcję w mieście Zełenskiego. „To jest symbol. Ukraina żyje”  Archived April 27, 2022, at the Wayback Machine.] (02.04.2022);
 Il Sole24 Ore - Chi è l’italiano che sta dietro all’acciaio ucraino (May 31, 2022);
 Financial Times - Ukraine: the $10bn steel plant at the heart of Russia's economic warfare
 The Wall Street Journal - Ukraine's Economy Stabilizes, a Boost Alongside Rapid Military Gains  Archived September 26, 2022, at the Wayback Machine.] (September 13, 2022);

External links
Official site http://ukraine.arcelormittal.com
Photos of Coking Plant, Blast Furnace No.9, Iron Ore Strip Mine and Blooming Mill.

ArcelorMittal
Companies based in Kryvyi Rih
Steel companies of Ukraine
Mining companies of Ukraine
Economy of Ukraine
Steel companies of the Ukrainian Soviet Socialist Republic
Ukrainian brands